The 1992–93 Irish League Cup (known as the Wilkinson Sword League Cup for sponsorship reasons) was the seventh edition of Northern Ireland's secondary football knock-out cup competition. It concluded on 20 April 1993 with the final.

Linfield were the defending champions after winning the League Cup for the second time by defeating Larne 3–0 in the previous final. This season they went out in the semi-finals to eventual winners Bangor, who lifted the cup for the first time with a 3–0 victory over Coleraine in the final. This is Bangor's only League Cup win, and only appearance in the final to date.

First round

|}

Second round

|}

Quarter-finals

|}

Semi-finals

|}

Final

References

Lea
1992–93 domestic association football cups
1992–93